Rh family, C glycoprotein, also known as RHCG, is a protein that in humans is encoded by the RHCG gene.

Function 

RHCG plays a critical role in ammonium handling and pH homeostasis in the kidney. The structure of the RHCG protein indicates that it has a hydrophobic ammonia-conducting channel and shows that it shares a common fold with the ammonia transporters, thus making it an ammonia transporter.

References

Further reading

Solute carrier family